Men's Giant Slalom World Cup 2005/2006

Calendar

Final point standings

In Men's Giant Slalom World Cup 2005/06 all results count.

Note:

In the last race only the best racers were allowed to compete and only the best 15 finishers were awarded with points.

Team results

bold = highest score italics = race wins

World Cup
FIS Alpine Ski World Cup men's giant slalom discipline titles